The 1996 SEC men's basketball tournament took place from March 7–10, 1996, at the Louisiana Superdome in New Orleans, Louisiana. The Mississippi State Bulldogs won the tournament title and received the SEC's automatic bid to the NCAA tournament by beating the Kentucky Wildcats by a score of 84–73. This was the first time the Mississippi State men's basketball team won the SEC tournament.

Television coverage 
Jefferson Pilot Sports regionally broadcast and syndicated coverage of the first round, the quarterfinals, and the semi-finals. Play-by-play commentary was done by Tom Hammond with color analyst Joe Dean, Jr. The championship game was broadcast nationally on CBS, called by play-by-play commentator Sean McDonough and color analyst Bill Raftery.

Bracket

References

SEC men's basketball tournament
1995–96 Southeastern Conference men's basketball season
1996 in sports in Louisiana
Basketball competitions in New Orleans
College basketball tournaments in Louisiana
1990s in New Orleans